Kheyrabad-e Koruni (also Romanized as Kheyrābād-e Korūnī; also known as Korūnī-ye Kheyrābād) is a village in Deris Rural District, in the Central District of Kazerun County, Fars Province, Iran. At the 2006 census, its population was 1,125, in 235 families.

References 

Populated places in Kazerun County